Araste is a village in Märjamaa Parish, Rapla County in western Estonia.

Painter Ants Laikmaa (Hans Laipman) (1866–1942) and freedom activist  (1865–1906) were born in Araste.

References

Villages in Rapla County
Kreis Wiek